The following is an alphabetical list of articles related to the U.S. state of Vermont.

0–9 

.vt.us – Internet second-level domain for the state of Vermont
14th state to join the United States of America

A
Addison County, Vermont
Adjacent states and province:

Agriculture in Vermont
Airports in Vermont
Aquaria in Vermont
commons:Category:Aquaria in Vermont
Archaeology in Vermont
Architecture in Vermont
Area codes in Vermont
Art museums and galleries in Vermont
commons:Category:Art museums and galleries in Vermont

B
Bennington County, Vermont
Botanical gardens in Vermont
commons:Category:Botanical gardens in Vermont
Buildings and structures in Vermont
commons:Category:Buildings and structures in Vermont
Burlington, Vermont

C

Caledonia County, Vermont
Capital of the State of Vermont
Capitol of the State of Vermont
commons:Category:Vermont State Capitol
Catamount Library Network 
Census statistical areas of Vermont
Chittenden County, Vermont
Cities in Vermont
commons:Category:Cities in Vermont
Climate change in Vermont
Climate of Vermont
Coat of Arms of the State of Vermont
Colleges and universities in Vermont
commons:Category:Universities and colleges in Vermont
Communications in Vermont
commons:Category:Communications in Vermont
Companies in Vermont
Constitution of the State of Vermont
Counties of the State of Vermont
commons:Category:Counties in Vermont
CRAG-VT
Cuisine of Vermont
commons:Category:Vermont cuisine
Culture of Vermont
commons:Category:Vermont culture

D
Dean, Howard
Demographics of Vermont

E
Earth Peoples Park
Economy of Vermont
:Category:Economy of Vermont
commons:Category:Economy of Vermont
Education in Vermont
:Category:Education in Vermont
commons:Category:Education in Vermont
Elections in the State of Vermont
commons:Category:Vermont elections
Energy in Vermont
Environment of Vermont
commons:Category:Environment of Vermont

 Essex County, Vermont

F

Festivals in Vermont
commons:Category:Festivals in Vermont
Flag of the State of Vermont
Forts in Vermont
:Category:Forts in Vermont
commons:Category:Forts in Vermont

 Franklin County, Vermont

G

Geography of Vermont
:Category:Geography of Vermont
commons:Category:Geography of Vermont
Geology of Vermont
commons:Category:Geology of Vermont
Ghost towns in Vermont
:Category:Ghost towns in Vermont
commons:Category:Ghost towns in Vermont
Government of the State of Vermont  website
:Category:Government of Vermont
commons:Category:Government of Vermont
Governor of the State of Vermont
List of governors of Vermont
Grand Isle County, Vermont
Great Seal of the State of Vermont

H
Heritage railroads in Vermont
commons:Category:Heritage railroads in Vermont
High schools of Vermont
Higher education in Vermont
Highway routes in Vermont
Hiking trails in Vermont
commons:Category:Hiking trails in Vermont
History of Vermont
Historical outline of Vermont
:Category:History of Vermont
commons:Category:History of Vermont
Hospitals in Vermont
House of Representatives of the State of Vermont
Housing Vermont

I
Images of Vermont
commons:Category:Vermont
Islands of Vermont

J

K

L
Lakes in Vermont
Lake Champlain
:Category:Lakes of Vermont
commons:Category:Lakes of Vermont
Lamoille County, Vermont
Landmarks in Vermont
commons:Category:Landmarks in Vermont
Lieutenant Governor of the State of Vermont
Lists related to the State of Vermont:
List of airports in Vermont
List of census statistical areas in Vermont
List of cities in Vermont
List of colleges and universities in Vermont
List of counties in Vermont
List of dams and reservoirs in Vermont
List of forts in Vermont
List of ghost towns in Vermont
List of governors of Vermont
List of high schools in Vermont
List of highway routes in Vermont
List of hospitals in Vermont
List of islands of Vermont
List of lakes in Vermont
List of law enforcement agencies in Vermont
List of lieutenant governors of Vermont
List of museums in Vermont
List of National Historic Landmarks in Vermont
List of newspapers in Vermont
List of people from Vermont
List of power stations in Vermont
List of radio stations in Vermont
List of railroads in Vermont
List of Registered Historic Places in Vermont
List of rivers of Vermont
List of school districts in Vermont
List of state forests in Vermont
List of state parks in Vermont
List of state prisons in Vermont
List of symbols of the State of Vermont
List of telephone area codes in Vermont
List of television stations in Vermont
List of towns in Vermont
List of United States congressional delegations from Vermont
List of United States congressional districts in Vermont
List of United States representatives from Vermont
List of United States senators from Vermont

M
Maps of Vermont
commons:Category:Maps of Vermont
Mass media in Vermont
Montpelier, Vermont, state capital since 1805
Monuments and memorials in Vermont
commons:Category:Monuments and memorials in Vermont
Mountains of Vermont
commons:Category:Mountains of Vermont
Museums in Vermont
:Category:Museums in Vermont
commons:Category:Museums in Vermont
Music of Vermont
:Category:Music of Vermont
commons:Category:Music of Vermont
:Category:Musical groups from Vermont
:Category:Musicians from Vermont

N
National Forests of Vermont
commons:Category:National Forests of Vermont
Natural history of Vermont
commons:Category:Natural history of Vermont
Nature centers in Vermont
commons:Category:Nature centers in Vermont
New England
Newspapers of Vermont

O
Orange County, Vermont
Orleans County, Vermont
Outdoor sculptures in Vermont
commons:Category:Outdoor sculptures in Vermont

P
People from Vermont
:Category:People from Vermont
commons:Category:People from Vermont
:Category:People by city in Vermont
:Category:People by county in Vermont
:Category:People from Vermont by occupation
Politics of Vermont
:Category:Politics of Vermont
commons:Category:Politics of Vermont
Protected areas of Vermont
commons:Category:Protected areas of Vermont

Q

R
Radio stations in Vermont
Railroad museums in Vermont
commons:Category:Railroad museums in Vermont
Railroads in Vermont
Registered historic places in Vermont
commons:Category:Registered Historic Places in Vermont
Religion in Vermont
:Category:Religion in Vermont
commons:Category:Religion in Vermont
Republic of New Connecticut
Republic of Vermont
Rivers of Vermont
commons:Category:Rivers of Vermont

 Rutland County, Vermont

S
Sanders, Bernie
School districts of Vermont
Scouting in Vermont
Second Vermont Republic
Secretary of the State of Vermont
Senate of the State of Vermont
Settlements in Vermont
Cities in Vermont
Towns in Vermont
Villages in Vermont
Census Designated Places in Vermont
Other unincorporated communities in Vermont
List of ghost towns in Vermont
Ski areas and resorts in Vermont
commons:Category:Ski areas and resorts in Vermont
Slavery in Vermont
Solar power in Vermont
Sports in Vermont
:Category:Sports in Vermont
commons:Category:Sports in Vermont
:Category:Sports venues in Vermont
commons:Category:Sports venues in Vermont
St. Albans Raid
State of Vermont  website
Constitution of the State of Vermont
Government of the State of Vermont
:Category:Government of Vermont
commons:Category:Government of Vermont
Executive branch of the government of the State of Vermont
Governor of the State of Vermont
Legislative branch of the government of the State of Vermont
Legislature of the State of Vermont
Senate of the State of Vermont
House of Representatives of the State of Vermont
Judicial branch of the government of the State of Vermont
Supreme Court of the State of Vermont
Vermont v. New Hampshire
State parks of Vermont
commons:Category:State parks of Vermont
State prisons of Vermont
Structures in Vermont
commons:Category:Buildings and structures in Vermont
Supreme Court of the State of Vermont
Symbols of the State of Vermont
:Category:Symbols of Vermont
commons:Category:Symbols of Vermont
 Sugar Mountain Farm

T
Telecommunications in Vermont
commons:Category:Communications in Vermont
Telephone area codes in Vermont
Television shows set in Vermont
Television stations in Vermont
Theatres in Vermont
commons:Category:Theatres in Vermont
Tourism in Vermont  website
commons:Category:Tourism in Vermont
Towns in Vermont
commons:Category:Cities in Vermont
Transportation in Vermont
:Category:Transportation in Vermont
commons:Category:Transport in Vermont

U
United States of America
States of the United States of America
United States census statistical areas of Vermont
United States congressional delegations from Vermont
United States congressional districts in Vermont
United States Court of Appeals for the Second Circuit
United States District Court for the District of Vermont
United States representatives from Vermont
United States senators from Vermont
Universities and colleges in Vermont
commons:Category:Universities and colleges in Vermont
US-VT – ISO 3166-2:US region code for the State of Vermont

V

Vermont  website
:Category:Vermont
commons:Category:Vermont
commons:Category:Maps of Vermont
Vermont Commons: Voices of Independence
Vermont Defendant Accommodation Project
Vermont elections, 1860
Vermont Foodbank
Vermont Housing Finance Agency
Vermont Information Processing
Vermont Organization of Koha Automated Libraries
Vermont Republic, 1777–1791
 Vermont copper
 Flag of the Green Mountain Boys
Stella quarta decima
Vermont State Colleges
Vermont State House
Vermont State Police
Vermont Woods Studios
Vermont World War II Army Airfields
VT – United States Postal Service postal code for the State of Vermont

W
Washington County, Vermont
Westminster, Vermont, capital of the Republic of New Connecticut 1777
Wikimedia
Wikimedia Commons:Category:Vermont
commons:Category:Maps of Vermont
Wikinews:Category:Vermont
Wikinews:Portal:Vermont
Wikipedia Category:Vermont
Wikipedia:WikiProject Vermont
:Category:WikiProject Vermont articles
:Category:WikiProject Vermont members
Wind power in Vermont
Windham County, Vermont
Windsor County, Vermont
Windsor, Vermont, capital of the Republic of New Connecticut 1777, the Vermont Republic 1777–1791, and the State of Vermont 1791-1805
Witch window

X

Y

Z

See also

Topic overview:
Vermont
Outline of Vermont

Vermont
 
Vermont